Sir Cumference is a series of children's educational books about math by Cindy Neuschwander and Wayne Geehan.

The books have been studied for their use in mathematics education.

Characters
Most of the characters of the book are named after math terms, such as Sir Cumference (circumference).

Sir Cumference
Sir Cumference is a knight in the kingdom of Camelot. He has a wife called Lady Di of Ameter and a son named Radius.

Di of Ameter
Di of Ameter is the wife of Sir Cumference. In the first book, she came up with all the different shapes of the table (parallelogram, square, etc.) and in Sir Cumference and the Dragon of Pi, she stayed with Sir Cumference when he turned into a dragon.

Radius
Radius is the son of Di of Ameter and Sir Cumference. He has a friend named Vertex in Sir Cumference and the Sword in the Cone, and plays an important role in both Sir Cumference and the Dragon of Pi and The Sword in the Cone first by turning his father to a dragon and back, and later assisting Vertex in becoming King. He is the focus of Sir Cumference and the Great Knight of Angleland, in which he becomes a knight after rescuing King Lell and his pair of dragons.

Vertex
Vertex is the best friend of Radius. He appears on the first page of Sir Cumference and the Sword in the Cone. He is quoted saying, "I've found out why King Arthur called us all here!" Sir Cumference and Radius agree Vertex should be the heir to the throne.

Series
Currently, there are 11 books in the series:
 Sir Cumference and the First Round Table (1997)
 Sir Cumference and the Dragon of Pi (1999)
 Sir Cumference and the Great Knight of Angleland (2001)
 Sir Cumference and the Sword in the Cone (2003)
 Sir Cumference and the Isle of Immeter (2006)
 Sir Cumference and All the Kings Tens (2009)
 Sir Cumference and the Viking's Map (2012)
 Sir Cumference and the Off-the-Charts Dessert (2013)
 Sir Cumference and the Roundabout Battle (2015)
 Sir Cumference and the Fracton Faire (2017)
 Sir Cumference Gets Decima's Point (2020)

References 

Children's fiction books
Series of children's books
Mathematics fiction books
Series of mathematics books